VA-8 has the following meanings:
State Route 8 (Virginia)
Virginia's 8th congressional district
A Subaru WRX STI S207 NBR Challenge Package